is a Japanese professional baseball infielder for the Tokyo Yakult Swallows of Nippon Professional Baseball (NPB).

Amateur career
Munetaka started playing baseball at five years of age. He entered Kyushū Gakuin Integrated High School where he became their team's regular first baseman and clean-up hitter. They made it to the 2015 Koshien national tournaments in his first year, but got defeated in the first round. He then played catcher in his 2nd and 3rd year, but they did not make it to any national tournaments. He hit a total of 52 home runs in high school, and his slugging prowess earned him the nickname "Babe Ruth of Higo", Higo being the former name of Kumamoto Prefecture.

Professional career

Tokyo Yakult Swallows
Despite not getting a lot of media exposure from appearances in national games, he was drafted in the first round of the 2017 NPB Draft by the Tokyo Yakult Swallows, Yomiuri Giants and the Rakuten Golden Eagles, as an alternative pick after they lost Kōtarō Kiyomiya to the Nippon Ham Fighters. The Swallows won the lottery, and signed him for a contract of 80 million yen and a 7.2 million yen annual salary. He was assigned jersey number 55.

2018
He spent most of the season playing in Eastern League (minors) games. He batted at .311 in 28 games until the end of April, with 3 home runs and 20 RBI. In June, he got awarded League MVP of the month for batting 0.315 and driving in 14 runs, last accomplished by a Swallows rookie in 2011 by Tetsuto Yamada. He also got voted into the Fresh All Star games in July. He continued to play well in the following months, and finally got the chance to play in the main squad on the September 16 game against the Carps. He debuted as the starting 3rd baseman, and hit a home run on his first at-bat. But after failing to record a hit in his next 5 appearances, he was sent back to the farm and ended the season there. He finished with a batting average of 0.288, 17 home runs, 70 RBIs and 16 stolen bases in the minors. Post-season, he was awarded both the Eastern League MVP and Rookie of the Year awards, and was given a 800,000 yen pay rise, bringing his annual salary to 8 million yen.

2019
2019 was Murakami's break out season. On February 27, he was selected to play for Japan national baseball team at the 2019 exhibition games against Mexico. His great performance during the pre-season exhibition games earned him the 3rd base spot in the season-opener. This made him the youngest Swallows player to start in the season opening game at 19 years old, beating the previous record of 21 year-old Seikichi Nishioka in 1958. He hit his 10th home run by May 10, and managed to secure the clean up position by May 12. He got voted into his first All-Star Game in July where he got top votes for 3rd base, and was also selected for the Home Run Derby showdown. On August 12, he hit his first walk-off home run against the Baystars and became the youngest NPB player to achieve this feat. He hit his 30th home run by August 22, and became the first Central League player drafted out of high school to notch at least 30 home runs within 2 years from his debut. On September 4, he broke the NPB RBI record of high school drafted players in their 2nd season by notching his 87th RBI. He was the only Swallows player to appear in all of the team's 143 games, and despite batting at only .231, he topped the team in home runs with 36 which tied the NPB home-run record for 2nd-year rookies, and finished 2nd in RBI with 96. On the other hand, he set a new league worst strikeout count amongst Japanese players with 184. His performance earned him the 2019 CL Rookie of the year award, and a 37 million pay rise which more than quadrupled his previous salary to 45 million yen.

2021
Murakami won the Central League MVP award following the 2021 season.

2022 
In 2022, Murakami became the first NPB player to hit a home run in five consecutive plate appearances, over the course of two games. On September 13, 2022, Murakami hit his 55th home run of the season, tying Sadaharu Oh for the most home runs by a Japanese player in a season, and for second in NPB overall, alongside Alex Cabrera, Tuffy Rhodes, and Oh. Unfortunately for Murakami, he would go on a slump, going 48 straight at-bats without a home run, but on the final day of the regular season, on October 3, 2022, Murakami would hit his 56th home run of the season, breaking Oh's record for the most home runs by a Japanese born player. He also became the first person who plays offense to win the NPB Triple Crown since Nobuhiko Matsunaka of the Fukuoka Daiei Hawks in 2004, and the first by a Central League player since Randy Bass of the Hanshin Tigers in 1986, and the youngest player to win the Triple Crown, at 22 years, eight months, and one day old at the conclusion of the 2022 regular season.

After the 2022 season, Murakami signed a three-year contract extension worth 600 million yen per year, which stipulates that the Swallows must post Murakami to Major League Baseball after the 2025 season.

References

External links

 Career statistics - NPB.jp

2000 births
Living people
Nippon Professional Baseball third basemen
Baseball people from Kumamoto Prefecture
Tokyo Yakult Swallows players
Nippon Professional Baseball MVP Award winners
Nippon Professional Baseball Rookie of the Year Award winners
Baseball players at the 2020 Summer Olympics
Olympic baseball players of Japan
Olympic medalists in baseball
Olympic gold medalists for Japan
Medalists at the 2020 Summer Olympics
21st-century Japanese people
2023 World Baseball Classic players